The 2001 African Volleyball Clubs Champions Championship was the 20th edition of African's premier club volleyball tournament held in Sousse, Tunisia.

Final

|}

Squads
Étoile du Sahel
3-Slim Chebbi (c), 4-Makram Temimi, 5-Khaled Maâref, 6-Yosri Handous, 7-Chaker Ghezal, 8-Mohamed Ben Slimène, 9-Noureddine Hfaiedh, 10-Hichem Ben Romdhane, 11-Tarak Sammari, 12-Salem Mejri, and 14-Walid Abbès. Head Coach: Bahri Trabelsi.
CS Sfaxien
1-Ghazi Koubaâ (c), 2-Riadh Hedhili, 3-Foued Loukil, 5-Samir Sellami, 8-Houssem Ayadi, 9-Nassim Hadroug, 10-Mejdi Toumi, 12-Héctor Soto, 13-Jawhar Ben Abdallah, and 16-Zied Larguech. Head Coach: Foued Kammoun.

References

External links
 Official African Volleyball Confederation website

African Clubs Championship (volleyball)
African Volleyball Clubs Champions Championship, 2001
2001 African Volleyball Clubs Champions Championship
African Volleyball Clubs Champions Championship